Valerian Tulgar is a politician from Transnistria. He is a member of parliament and president of the Union of Moldovans in Transnistria.

Valerian Tulgar was born November 27, 1956 in Bessarabia, in the village of Sărătenii Vechi, Teleneşti district of Moldova.

References

1956 births
Living people
Transnistrian politicians
People from Telenești District